Eleonore Sophie, Princess of Anhalt-Bernburg (née Princess Eleonore Sophie of Schleswig-Holstein-Sonderburg; 14 February 1603 - 5 January 1675) was a member of the Danish royal family and the consort of Christian II, Prince of Anhalt-Bernburg.

Biography 
Eleonore was born in Sønderborg on 14 February 1603 to John II, Duke of Schleswig-Holstein-Sonderburg, the third son of Christian III of Denmark and Norway and Dorothea of Saxe-Lauenburg, and Agnes Hedwig of Anhalt, the daughter of Joachim Ernest, Prince of Anhalt.

On 28 February 1625 Eleonore married Prince Christian of Anhalt-Bernburg in Ahrensbök. They had fifteen children:

Beringer (b. Schüttorf, 21 April 1626 – d. Bernburg, 17 October 1627).
Sophie (b. Bernburg, 11 September 1627 – d. Bernburg, 12 September 1627).
Joachim Ernest (b. Ballenstedt, 13 June 1629 – d. Ballenstedt, 23 December 1629).
Christian, Hereditary Prince of Anhalt-Bernburg (b. Bernburg, 2 January 1631 – d. Bernburg, 20 June 1631).
Erdmann Gideon, Hereditary Prince of Anhalt-Bernburg (b. Harzgerode, 21 January 1632 – d. Bernburg, 4 April 1649).
Bogislaw (b. Harzgerode, 7 October 1633 – d. Harzgerode, 7 February 1634).
Victor Amadeus, Prince of Anhalt-Bernburg (b. Harzgerode, 6 October 1634 – d. Bernburg, 14 February 1718).
Eleonore Hedwig (b. Bernburg, 28 October 1635 – d. Gandersheim, 10 September 1685).
Ernestine Auguste (b. Plön, 23 December 1636 – d. Bernburg, 5 October 1659).
Angelika (b. Bernburg, 6 June 1639 – d. Quedlinburg, 13 October 1688).
Anna Sophia (b. Bernburg, 13 September 1640 – d. Sonnenwalde, 25 April 1704), married on 20 September 1664 to George Frederick, Count of Solms-Sonnenwalde; their daughter Sophie Albertine married Karl Frederick, Prince of Anhalt-Bernburg.
Karl Ursinus (b. Bernburg, 18 April 1642 – d. Parma, 4 January 1660).
Ferdinand Christian (b. Bernburg, 23 October 1643 – d. Ballenstedt, 14 March 1645).
Marie (b. Ballenstedt, 25 January 1645 – d. Bernburg, 5 January 1655).
Anna Elisabeth (b. Bernburg, 19 March 1647 – d. Bernstadt, 3 September 1680), married on 13 March 1672 to Christian Ulrich I, Duke of Württemberg-Oels.

In 1630 her husband succeeded his father, Christian I, Prince of Anhalt-Bernburg, as the Prince of Anhalt-Bernburg.  After her husband's death in 1656, their son Victor Amadeus became Prince of Anhalt-Bernburg.

She died in Ballenstedt on 5 January 1675. She was buried in the crypt of the Castle Church of St. Aegidien.

References 

1603 births
1675 deaths
Burials at Schlosskirche St. Aegidien (Bernburg)
House of Oldenburg in Schleswig-Holstein
Danish princesses
Princesses of Anhalt-Bernburg
People from Augustenborg, Denmark